François-Henri-Joseph Blaze, known as Castil-Blaze (1 December 1784 – 11 December 1857), was a French musicologist, music critic, composer, and music editor.

Biography
Blaze was born and grew up in Cavaillon, Vaucluse.  He went to Paris to study law, but also to learn music, at the Conservatoire de Paris. After having passed several more years in Vaucluse (southeastern France), Castil-Blaze moved back to Paris.

A large part of his activities consisted of adapting French and foreign opera for different stages in French provinces. In these cases, Castil-Blaze adapted the libretto as well as the music. This arranging work was highly criticized, but Castil-Blaze claimed that this permitted part of the public to become familiar with opera.

Castil-Blaze is mostly known as a music critic. Beginning on 7 December 1820, he published Musical Chronicles in the Journal des débats, signing his articles, which were often very controversial, 'XXX'. In these irregularly-published chronicles (about 30 per year), Castil-Blaze seemed to take certain liberties. Most of the chronicles criticized the lyric works, but others were dedicated to thoughts about music, to composers' necrologies (Weber in 1826, Beethoven in 1828), or to concert reviews. Castil-Blaze wrote for the Journal des débats until 1832 (his replacement there was Hector Berlioz), when he joined le Constitutionnel; he also collaborated in Fétis's Revue musicale (Paris, 1827), as well as other periodicals or reviews. 
He is without a doubt, in France, the first music critic to have studied music.
 
He is the author of various books and articles on the theory of music, music history, and the history of the theater. He started a series of three works dedicated to three great lyric theaters of Paris: the Opéra National de Paris, the Comédie-Italienne, and the Opéra-Comique. He was only able to finish and publish the first two before his death; the third remains in manuscript at the Bibliothèque nationale de France and was published for the first time in 2012. Today, these works arouse the interest of historians, but also their distrust, because they contain numerous anecdotes that cannot always be verified.

As a composer, Castil-Blaze mostly made arrangements, but he was also the author of several original works, particularly of sacred music, of which there are two high masses. Finally, he worked as an editor, first for his own literary and musical works, but he was not limited to this: he was among the editors of the works of Beethoven.

He died in Paris.

Literary works
De l'Opéra en France. Paris: Janet & Cotelle, 1820. 
Dictionnaire de musique moderne, 2 volumes. Paris: Au magasin de musique de la Lyre moderne, 1821. 2nd ed., 1825. 
Chapelle-musique des rois de France. Paris: Paulin, 1832. 
La Danse et les ballets depuis Bacchus jusqu'à Mlle Taglioni. Paris: Paulin, 1832. 
Le Mémorial du Grand-Opéra. Paris: Castil-Blaze, 1847. 
Molière musicien, 2 volumes. Paris: Castil-Blaze, 1852. 
L'Académie impériale de musique de 1645 à 1855. Paris: Castil-Blaze, 1855. 
L'Opéra italien de 1548 à 1856. Paris: Castil-Blaze, 1856. 
L'Art des vers lyriques. Paris: Castil-Blaze, 1858 (posth.). 
Histoire de l'Opéra-Comique, unfinished, manuscript. Lyon: Symétrie, 2012 (posth.).

Musical compositions
Trois quatuors pour deux violons, viole et violoncelle, oeuv. 17. Paris: Lyre moderne, 1810.  From Sibley Music Library Digital Scores Collection
Trio in C, Op. 17 No.2 for three bassoons
Wind Sextet No. 1 in E flat

Notes

Bibliography 
 Gislason, Donald Garth (1992). Castil-Blaze, "De l'Opéra en France" and the Feuilleton of the Journal des Débats (1820-1832). Ph. D. Dissertation, U. of British Columbia. UMI.
 Klotz, Roger (1965). Recherches sur Castil-Blaze, Thesis, Faculté des Lettres d'Aix en Provence.
 Lovy, J. (1857). "Castil-Blaze" (obituary), Le Ménestrel (20 December).
 Newark, Cormac (2001). "Castil-Blaze [Blaze, François-Henri-Joseph]" in The New Grove Dictionary of Music and Musicians, 2nd edition, edited by Stanley Sadie. London: Macmillan.  (hardcover).  (eBook). See also Oxford Music Online (subscription required).

External links

 

1784 births
1857 deaths
People from Cavaillon
French male classical composers
French Romantic composers
French music critics
French male non-fiction writers
19th-century classical composers
19th-century French composers
19th-century French musicologists
19th-century French male musicians